Events in the year 1951 in Spain.

Incumbents
Caudillo: Francisco Franco

Births
January 14 - Carme Elías.
August 3 - José Pujol.
September 7 - Javier Marías.
November 30 - José Ángel Egido.
August 22 -José Brasa.

Deaths
 7 June – Luis de Arana, sailor

See also
 List of Spanish films of 1951

References

 
Years of the 20th century in Spain
1950s in Spain
Spain
Spain